The Emperor Napoleon in His Study at the Tuileries is an 1812 painting by Jacques-Louis David. It shows French Emperor Napoleon I in uniform in his study at the Tuileries Palace. Despite the detail, it is unlikely that Napoleon posed for the portrait.

It was a private commission from the Scottish nobleman and admirer of Napoleon, Alexander Hamilton, 10th Duke of Hamilton in 1811 and completed in 1812. Originally shown at Hamilton Palace, it was sold to Archibald Primrose, 5th Earl of Rosebery in 1882, from whom it was bought by the Samuel H. Kress Foundation in 1954, which deposited it in Washington D.C.'s National Gallery of Art, where it now hangs.

Iconography
Vertical in format, it shows Napoleon standing, three-quarters life size, wearing the uniform of a colonel of the Imperial Guard Foot Grenadiers (blue with white facings and red cuffs). He also wears his Légion d'honneur and Order of the Iron Crown decorations, along with gold epaulettes, white French-style culottes and white stockings. His face is turned towards the viewer and his right hand is in his jacket.

Piled on the desk are a pen, several books, dossiers and rolled papers. More rolled papers and a map are on the green carpet to the left of the desk – on these papers is the painter's signature LVDci DAVID OPVS 1812. All this, along with Napoleon's unbuttoned cuffs, wrinkled stockings, disheveled hair, the flickering candles and the time on the clock (4:13am) are all meant to imply he has been up all night, writing laws such as the Code Napoléon – the word "Code" is prominent on the rolled papers on the desk. This maintains his new civil rather than heroic (as in Canova's Napoleon as Mars the Peacemaker) or military (as in David's own Napoleon Crossing the Alps) image, though the sword on the chair's armrest still refers back to his military successes. The fleurs-de-lys and heraldic bees also imply the stability of the imperial dynasty.

Development 

An analysis of the original painting reveals that the artist reedited the composition and details several times to balance the image, add allusions, and capture a complete story.

Brush strokes and texture indicate that an earlier version had
Napoleon's upper body flanked by two fluted columns about the width
of the figure's torso.  These strong vertical elements would have created a
distraction from the central figure.

These columns were revised to a carved panel in shadow (on the viewer's
left) and a clock with a large face (viewer's right) on level with and
somewhat larger than the figure's face.  The clock was later repainted
with a smaller face moved up and to the right, with the clock body still
covering the underlying column brush strokes.

These revisions greatly improved the compositional balance of the
painting's upper section, reducing the impression of three vertical
columns.  They successfully moved the viewer's focus to Napoleon's face and
expression and away from the presumably accurate stature and
middle-heavy build.

The change also allowed incorporating additional symbology, most notably
the time (4:13).

Other revisions were added symbols on the table items and lower section,
many painted over fleurs-de-lis which are conspicuously rare in the final image.

References

Further reading

Antoine Schnapper David, 1748–1825, catalogue de l'exposition Louvre-Versailles 1989 ed. Réunion des musées nationaux, Paris, 1989 – Sur le tableau No 206 et 207 pages 474–477.

External links

National Gallery of Art - catalogue entry
Second version - image

1812 paintings
Napoleon
Collections of the National Gallery of Art
Napoleon
Paintings of Napoleon